Obere Kyll is a former Verbandsgemeinde ("collective municipality") in the district Vulkaneifel, in Rhineland-Palatinate, Germany. It is situated on the upper course of the river Kyll, approx. 55 km south-west of Bonn. The seat of the Verbandsgemeinde was in Jünkerath. In January 2019 it was merged into the Verbandsgemeinde Gerolstein.

The Verbandsgemeinde Obere Kyll consisted of the following Ortsgemeinden ("local municipalities"):

Former Verbandsgemeinden in Rhineland-Palatinate